Air Kerala is a proposed airline promoted by the Government of Kerala, registered as a subsidiary of the Cochin International Airport Limited (CIAL). In March 2015, the board of directors of the airline decided to defer the start of commercial operations until a clear picture of relevant government rules emerged.

The airline had initially planned to commence operations in April 2013, however, the Indian government's stipulation, that an Indian airline seeking to operate international air services should first have a fleet of at least 20 aircraft and a five-year experience in operating domestic services, had put the project on the backburner.

Air Kerala will be India's first airline with a State government as one of the primary stakeholders. The State government, CIAL and other public sector companies will together hold 26% of the shares of the company, while the remaining 74% will be issued to individuals and private groups.

History

The project was first proposed in 2005 during the Chief Ministership of Oommen Chandy and Air Kerala International Services was registered as a fully owned subsidiary of Cochin International Airport in February 2006. However the proposal went to cold storage, after the ruling UDF government stepped down in 2006. On returning to power in 2011, the UDF government decided to revive the project. The hardship faced by the Non-resident Keralites, due to high airfares and frequent cancellation of flights between Kerala and the Gulf countries, led to the revival of the Air Kerala proposal. The project has evoked good interest from the various Malayali businessmen and Non-resident Keralites in the Middle East.

Business plan

The primary objective of the airline is to eventually operate international flights to the Middle East, where around 2.5 million Keralites are employed. The airline will follow the model of Cochin International Airport Limited (CIAL), which is India's first PPP airport. The architect of CIAL's success and its present MD, V J Kurian IAS, is expected to head the proposed Air Kerala.

Air Kerala plans to raise  200 crore through equity as initial capital. While 26% of shares will be held by the state government, CIAL and public sector undertakings, the remaining 74% will be held by shareholders. The state government and CIAL will fund  50 crore each while  100 crore will be mobilized from the public as shares. Each share is valued at  10,000 and it is expected that at least  Keralites will invest in the project. Consultancy firm Ernst & Young, that conducted a study in 2006, is now preparing the Detailed Project Report for the government.

Hurdles

The proposal of starting the airline was first floated in 2006. But the central government rejected the proposal, as it did not meet the criteria for operating international services. The Government of Kerala has sought speedy approval from the MoCA for launching Air Kerala. The government has also sought exemptions on the MoCA regulatory norms, that require airline companies at least five years experience in domestic flight operations and a minimum fleet size of 20 aircraft, to start international flight services. The state government cites the exemption given by the central government to Air India when it launched its subsidiary, Air India Express.

Current Status
Air Kerala was expected to submit formal application in November 2012 before the Directorate General of Civil Aviation (India) (DGCA) for getting the no objection certificate for services, as stated by the Minister for Fisheries, Port and Excise, Shri. K. Babu, who is also a member of the director board of Air Kerala.
Kerala's former Chief Minister Oommen Chandy said in February 2014 that the Union government's stipulation for starting international airline operations had put the project on the back burner. He said that his government would pursue the project if these stipulations were removed.
In December 2014, the Board of directors decided to commence domestic operations and began negotiations for leasing a 15-seater aircraft to fly between the state's three airports, but changed their mind and began looking at leasing an aircraft that could fly non-stop for five hours so as to achieve the proposed minimum required domestic flying credits at the earliest. In March 2015, the board of directors of the airline decided to defer the start of commercial operations until decided to wait till a "clear picture" emerged on the move to amend the '5/20' rule. As of 2017 the rule has been amended and made 0/20 rule

References

External links
 Kerala set to fly solo
 Air Kerala may fly overseas on FDI
 Air Kerala: tour operators ready to buy 50% seats

Government-owned companies of Kerala
Proposed airlines of India